List of software that implements the Real-Time Messaging Protocol, primarily known from Adobe Flash.

RTMP live video encoder software 

 Adobe Media Flash Live Encoder
 FFmpeg
 Nimble Streamer Transcoder
 Open Broadcaster Software
 XSplit Broadcaster
 Wirecast
 Wowza Transcoder, a module part of the Wowza Streaming Engine

RTMP server software 

The primary motivation for RTMP was to be a protocol for playing Flash video (Adobe Flash Player) maintaining persistent connections and allows low-latency communication, but in July 2017, Adobe announced that it would end support for Flash Player at the end of 2020, and continued to encourage the use of open HTML5 standards in place of Flash.

Due to this RTMP streaming support is declining rapidly. But it is still very useful for broadcasting live, because of its low-latency. The Broadcaster ingest the stream through a RTMP server which then encodes and sends the resultant stream to a HLS  (HTTP Live Streaming) URL.  Which then can use a number of players and devices from desktops to smartphones to social media sites.

Some full implementation RTMP servers are:

 Adobe Flash Media Server
 FreeSWITCH RTMP media streaming available with mod_rtmp and allow interconnecting with other VoIP protocols (SIP, H.323), etc.
 Nginx with nginx-rtmp-module
 Nimble Streamer has RTMP streaming, publishing and re-publishing
 Helix Universal Server can support RTMP, RTMPT and RTMPS streaming for live and on-demand content. (Discontinued in 2014)
Red5 Media Server is a Java open source project.
 Unreal Media Server supports live RTMP streaming, in real-time and buffered modes
 Wowza Streaming Engine has full support for RTMP streaming for live streams and VOD
 WebORB Integration Server (RTMP/RTMPT/RTMPS messaging and media streaming available for .NET and Java Enterprise, Community and Cloud editions)
 Flashphoner Web Call Server – a multi-protocol server (including SIP, RTMP and other)

Client software

Reference 

RTMP software